Sappa may refer to:

Manilkara excisa, also known as Sappa, a local name for a species of tree of Northern Jamaica
Sapë, a town in Albania (sometimes transliterated as 'Sappa')
Roman Catholic Diocese of Sapë, one of six such diocese of Albania (sometimes transliterated as 'Sappa')
Sappa, Ethiopia, early capital city (1800–1825) of the former Ethiopian Kingdom of Limmu-Ennarea
Sappa Township, Decatur County, Kansas
Sappa Township, Harlan County, Nebraska
SAPPA, acronym (South Australian Paintball Players Association)
, a letter, from the ancient Semitic language Ge'ez

See also
Sapa (disambiguation)